Laut gedacht (Thinking Aloud) is the second studio album by German rock band Silbermond, released on April 21, 2006. Primarily produced by Ingo Politz and Bernd Wendlandt, the album peaked at #1 on the German and Austrian albums chart, and at #3 in Switzerland. Laut gedacht was released in three different versions: Basic Version, Standard Version and Premium Version.

The album cover features a looped square and a photo of the band.

Track listing

Versions

Basic version
 Normal Album
 No Booklet
 Studio Report
 Sign: Red Sticker

Standard version
 Normal Album
 Booklet
 Studio Report
 Code for a Special Download Area at Silbermond's Homepage
 Sign: Green sticker

Premium version
 Normal Album
 Booklet
 Code
 Studio Report
 An 85 Minute DVD with the Highlights from the Verschwende deine Zeit-Abschlusskonzert and the Most Memorable Moments of Silbermond 2005.
 Sign: Blue sticker

Charts

Weekly charts

Year-end charts

Certifications and sales

References

External links
 Silbermond.de — official site

2006 albums
German-language albums
Silbermond albums